"Bonnie & Clyde" is a song by Die Toten Hosen. It's the third single and the ninth track from the album Opium fürs Volk.

"Bonnie & Clyde" is a romantic song about a man and a woman, who want to play Bonnie and Clyde - criminals that are in love with each other. At the start of the song, the two have never met before, but the man knows she's the one he's been missing.

An English version was recorded for Crash-Landing.

Die Ärzte covered the song as a part of a medley in a concert of 1998, which is available on the single of "Die Schönen und das Biest: Elke (live)".

Music video
The music video was directed by Ralf Schmerberg.

Bonnie & Clyde wannabees met at a bar and click instantaneously. They steal a car, rob a "cash-in-transit" and then go to a hotel and make love until the morning after. The police break in to arrest them. They are jailed, but escape later with the help of their bandmates (the man is played by Campino). The woman gets shot and the gang tries to escape in a car (with "ON TOUR" written on it), but the driver (played by Andi) also gets shot and they crash the car, which results in a fatal explosion.

Track listing
 "Bonnie & Clyde" (Breitkopf/Frege) − 3:30
 "Kleiner Junge" (Little boy) (von Holst/Frege) − 3:58
 "Herzglück harte Welle" (roughly Heartluck strong wave) (Rohde/Frege) – 1:57
 "Do You Love Me" (Stanley, Ezrin, Fowley) − 3:11 (Kiss cover)

Charts

1996 singles
Songs about Bonnie and Clyde
Die Toten Hosen songs
Songs written by Campino (singer)
Songs written by Michael Breitkopf
1996 songs